Matheron may refer to:

 Georges Matheron (1930–2000), French mathematician and geologist
 Philippe Matheron (1807-1899), 1807 – 1899) was a French palaeontologist and geologist